Christian Falsnaes (born 1980 in Copenhagen, Denmark) is a Danish artist living and working in Berlin, Germany.

Education 
Falsnaes studied philosophy in Copenhagen from 2001 to 2003. After a short stay in Zurich, he went to Vienna and studied from 2005 to 2011 at the Academy of Fine Arts under Daniel Richter, Peter Kogler and Constanze Ruhm.

Career 
Before his art studies, Falsnaes made performances and interactions in the public space using his background as a graffiti painter. Since 2009, he has developed performances based on a pre-written script. In the beginning, he played a central role in motivating the public to actively participate in the action. "Through the active involvement, the viewer should cross personal boundaries, overcome them and feel the moment of liberation and change. [1] Falsnaes said in an interview [2]: "When I involve the viewer in the process of art production, it is also about sharing all of this, instead of showing the result of my private artistic process."

The study of authority, hierarchies, social and, above all, pop-cultural rituals is an integral part of his art.

"Working with the structure of power, or with group dynamics, is in itself political. It is not so much about people following or responding in a certain way, but about making the audience aware of how certain rituals affect them. "Christian Falsnaes [3]

In his more recent work Falsnaes withdrew physically from the actions. The instructions to the audience are now provided by means of headphones, loudspeakers, or by employed "instructors". [4] Often, his performances are  performed as "female versions", in which the earlier role of Falsnaes is taken over by a female performer. He often mixes himself among the audience and participates as a spectator. Through this withdrawal an additional authority transfer takes place, involving the public even more in his art. [5] Many performances are documented in video recordings and the main part of these recordings have been well planned out in advance and live on as independent video works. There are, however, also works of art arising from the actions, such as canvases painted by the audience according to the artist's instructions. [6] This includes "surface memory" where a  freshly painted canvas is smeared onto the walls in a public space leaving behind an abstract wall work as well as an altered canvas.

Exhibitions

Solo exhibitions (selection) 
 2016: Front, Yarat Contemporary Art Space, Baku
 2016:Thousand Faces, Statens Museum for Kunst, Copenhagen 
 2016: First, 1646, The Hague
 2016: Many, Juan & Patricia Vergez Collection, Buenos Aires
 2016: Available, Kunstverein Braunschweig
 2015: Front (Kareth Schaffer), KIOSK, Gent
 2015:The title is your name, Bielefelder Kunstverein, Bielefeld
 2015: Available, Kunstverein Braunschweig, Braunschweig
 2014: Performance Works, PSM, Berlin
 2014: Art Basel Statements, Art Basel, Basel
 2013: Formations of bodies -  Opening, KW Institute of Contemporary Art, Berlin
 2013:One, DREI, Cologne
 2011: ELIXIR, PSM, Berlin
 2011: Existing Things, OSLO10, Basel
 2011: Fulfilling Your Expectations, Rohde Contemporary, Copenhagen 
 2010:There and Back, Skånes Konstförening, Malmö, Sweden
 2008:Rational Animal, Niederösterreiches Museum, Vienna

Group exhibitions (selection) 
 2016: Conditions of Political Choreography, CCA, Tel Aviv
 2016:20 Years, Migros Museum für Gegenwartskunst, Zurich
 2016:The gestural, 21'er Haus, Vienna
 2016: Head to Head, Castlefield Gallery, Manchester 
 2016: Today's Art Festival, The Hague
 2016: Take Up Your Space, KAI10 / Arthena Foundation, Düsseldorf
 2016: Manifesta 11, Zurich
 2016: Im Raum mit, BNKR, Munich
 2016: Stellung nehmen, Kestnergesellschaft, Hannover
 2015:Preis der Nationalgalerie, Hamburger Bahnhof, Berlin 
 2015: Extension du domaine du jeu, Centre Pompidou, Paris 
 2015: The city is the star, ZKM | Zentrum für Kunst und Medientechnologie Karlsruhe
 2015: Destination Wien, Kunsthalle Wien, Vienna
 2015: History is a warm gun, n.b.k. Neuer Berliner Kunstverein, Berlin
 2015: Life in a Castle. Works from the Collection, Musée départemental d'art contemporain de Rochechouart
 2015: European Media Art Festival, Kunsthalle Osnabrück
 2015: More Konzeption conception now, Museum Morsbroich, Leverkusen 
 2015: The Lulennial - a slight gestuary, Lulu, Mexico City
 2015: 30 + 30 retro/ perspektiv, Museum für Neue Kunst, Freiburg
 2014:Reykjavik Dance Festival, Reykjavik Art Museum, Reykjavik
 2014: Public, Art Basel / Miami Beach
 2014: Performance proletarians, MAGASIN - Centre National d’art Contemporain de Grenoble
 2014: Vertigo of reality, Akademie der Künste, Berlin
 2014: Vor Ort, Bielefelder Kunstverein, Bielefeld
 2014: Maldives Exodus Caravan Show, Te Tuhi Centre for the Arts, New Zealand
 2014: Is it Y(ours)?, Museum Bärengasse, Zurich
 2014: Now and again – Performance for video, Fotografisk Center, Copenhagen
 2013: Ihre Geschichte(n), Bonner Kunstverein, Bonn
 2013: Gelatin - Stop - Anna Ly Sing - Stop, Schinkel Pavilion, Berlin
 2013: Maldives Exodus Caravan Show, Serra dei Giardini, Venice
 2013: Grundfrage (Question Fondamentale), Crac Alsace, Altkirch
 2013: Regionalismus, Salzburger Kunstverein, Salzburg
 2013: Enten/Eller, Nikolaj Contemporary Art Centre, Copenhagen
 2013: Entweder/oder, Haus am Waldsee, Berlin

Awards 
 2017: Future Generation Art Prize (shortlist) 
 2015: Preis der Nationalgalerie (shortlist) 
 2015: Prix K-Way Per4m 
 2008: H13 Prize for Performance 
 2008: International Prize for Performance (shortlist)

Press 
 2016: АРТ-ТЕРАПИЯ, Баку Журнал, Baku Magazine
 2016: Christian Falsnaes, Artist's Favorites, Spike Art Quarterly
 2016: Christa Sigg, Der Animateur, ART Das Kunstmagazin
 2016: Arielle Bier, The Audience is Present, SEEK magazine
 2016: Raimar Stange, Das direkte Verhältnis von Kunst und Publikum, Kunstforum 
 2016: Sofie Crabbe, Move!, Metropolis M  
 2016: Raimar Stange, Gegen die Angst, Polar Zeitschrift für Kultur
 2015: Annika Reith, Ohne dich gibt es kein Werk,  Spex        
 2015: Marcus Woeller, Kontrollierte Gruppendynamik, Die Welt
 2015: Camilla Stockmann, Jeg vil nedbryde afstanden, Politiken
 2015: Kito Nedo, Christian Falsnaes, Art Das Kunstmagazin
 2015:  Sabrina Schleichler, Am Puls der Zeit, Kunstzeitung
 2015:  Ingeborg Wiensowski, Übernehmen sie die Kontrolle!, Kultur SPIEGEL 
 2015: Noemi Smolik, Focus: Christian Falsnaes, Frieze
 2015: Peter Funken, Schwindel der Wirklichkeit, Kunstforum  
 2015:  Raimar Stange, Angst und Konfliktbereit(et), Kunstforum 
 2015: Jahresrückblick - Kunstwerk des Jahres, Monopol
 2015: Raimar Stange, Christian Falsnaes - Performance Works, ArtReview
 2014:                 Angela Hohmann, Papier muss brennen, Tagesspiegel
 2014: Eva Scharrer, Sie verlassen jetzt die Komfortzone!, artmagazine.cc 
 2014: Lotte Løvholm, Rub your body against a stranger, Kopenhagen.dk 
 2014:  Josie Thaddeus-Johns, The audience is my material: Christian Falsnaes, Sleek Magazine
 2014: Julia Halperin, Performance: Do you buy it?, The art newspaper
 2014:  Marcus Woeller, Und Abends mit die Skulpturen nach Hause gehen, Die Welt
 2014: Boris Pofalla, Watchlist: Christian Falsnaes, Monopol
 2014: Noemi Smolik, Christian Falsnaes - One (review), Artforum 
 2014: Raimar Stange, Highlights: Christian Falsnaes, Kaleidoscope
 2014: Fanny Gonella, Social construction - Conversation with Christian Falsnaes, Dust Magazine
 2014:  Raimar Stange, On art and theatricality in Berlin, ArtReview
 2014: Maike Müller, Abgewetzt durch Zeit und Pragmatismus (review), Monopol online   
 2013: Sabrina Schleicher, Singen, Summen, Tanzen, Kunstzeitung 
 2013:   Raimar Stange, Yes we can! Zur Kraft politischer Performances, artist Kunstmagazin 
 2013: Anne Kohlik, Das Vermächtnis der Frauen im Kunstbetrieb, Frankfurter Allgemeine Zeitung
 2013: Almuth Spiegler, Starter: Christian Falsnaes, ART - Das Kunstmagazin    
 2012:  Love and security (Artist feature), Tissue Magazine 
 2012:  Kulturpalast, ZDF Kultur 
  2012: Carson Chan, Express yourself - Portrait: Christian Falsnaes, Spike Art Quarterly 
 2012: John Beeson, Performance and authority (review), Spike Art Quarterly

Catalogues 
 Christian Falsnaes - ELIXIR, Distanz 
 How to frame - On the Threshold of Performing and Visual Arts, Sternberg Press 
 History is a Warm Gun, n.b.k., Berlin, Verlag Walther König 
 Vertigo of Reality, ex.cat., Verlag Walther König    
 The Lulennial: A Slight Gestuary, ex.cat, Mousse Publishing
 30/30 retro/perspektiv, ex.cat. Museum für Neue Kunst Freiburg, 2015
 More Konzeption Conception now, ex.cat, Kettler Verlag, 2015
 One, ex.cat, DREI, Cologne
 Søren Kierkegaard Entweder/oder, ex.cat., Verlag Walther König, 2013
 H13 Preis für Performance 2007 - 2012, Kunstraum Niederösterreich, 2013
 Increasingly colourful – Current Painting from Austria, ex.cat., Kerber Verlag, 2012
 Regionale12, ex.cat, Regionale, 2012
 Modes of Address, ex.cat., Salzburger Kunstverein, 2012
 A good reason is one that looks like one, Message Salon, Zürich, 2012
 The present author – Who speaks in Performance?, Revolver Publishing, 2011
 PerformIC 2010, ex.cat/DVD, Innsbruck Contemporary, 2010

References 
 Stella Plapp, "Kunst und Körper", Bachelorarbeit, Karl-Franzens-Universität Graz, 2014
 Hochspringen↑ Kunstforum International 2016
 Hochspringen↑ Annika Reith, "Ohne dich gibt es kein Werk", Spex 11/2015
 Hochspringen↑ Marcus Woeller, "Kontrollierte Gruppendynamik", Die Welt, 9/2015
 Hochspringen↑ Raimar Stange, "Das direkte Verhältnis von Kunst und Publikum", Kunstforum International # 240, 2016
 Hochspringen↑ Eva Scharrer, "Sie verlassen jetzt die Komfortzone!", artmagazine, 10/2014

Notes

External links 
 Christian Falsnaes website 
 PSM Gallery website

1980 births
Danish performance artists
Living people
Artists from Berlin
People from Copenhagen